The Yugoslavia national badminton team represented Yugoslavia in international badminton team competitions. It was managed by the Badminton Federation of Yugoslavia, also known as Badmintonska Savez Jugoslavije. The national team competed in the Helvetia Cup two times and were runners-up in 1975.

The Yugoslavian junior team competed in the European Junior Badminton Championships 3 times before the dissolution of Yugoslavia. Lučka Križman was the only Yugoslavian badminton player to medal at any international badminton event.

Participation in Helvetia Cup 
The Helvetia Cup or European B Team Championships was a European mixed team championship in badminton. The first Helvetia Cup tournament took place in Zurich, Switzerland in 1962. The tournament took place every two years from 1971 until 2007, after which it was dissolved.

Participation in European Junior Team Badminton Championships 

 Mixed Team

Medal table

List of medalists

Squad 
Before the dissolution of Yugoslavia, the following players were selected to represent the country in international tournaments.

Male players
Danče Pohar
Stane Koprivšek
Gregor Berden
Slavko Županič
Jani Caleta
Mitja Žorga
Oki Drinovec
Jani Drinovec

Female players
Mariča Amf
Meta Bogel
Lučka Križman
Breda Križman
Vita Bohinc

References 

Badminton
National badminton teams
Badminton in Yugoslavia